Love Exists is a short documentary essay on the Parisian suburbs made in 1960, written and directed by Maurice Pialat and produced by Pierre Braunberger.

Awards
 Louis Delluc Prize 1960
 Venice Film Festival 1961
 Prix Lumière 1961

External links
 
 Commentary (in French)

1960 films
1960s French-language films
Films directed by Maurice Pialat
1960s short documentary films
French short documentary films
1960s French films